Carlos Alberto Franzetti (born June 3, 1948) is a composer and arranger from Buenos Aires, Argentina.

Early life
Franzetti was born on June 3, 1948 in Buenos Aires, Argentina to Carlos Osvaldo  Franzetti and Beatriz Julia Elena DeGiacomo de Franzetti. He had one older sister, Beatriz "Ago" Franzetti. The Franzetti family was of Italian, Spanish and Irish ancestry and practiced Catholicism.

Music career
Franzetti started studying music at the National Conservatory in Buenos Aires at the age of six and later began taking private piano lessons. He began studying music composition after moving to Mexico in 1970 with Humberto Hernandez Medrano. 
Mr. Franzetti moved to the U.S. in 1974 working at first with Salsa bands and later composing and arranging music for advertising. He studied for two years at Juilliard School, where he continued his conducting  studies with Vincent La Selva.

Throughout his career, Franzetti has composed symphonies, concertos, operas, chamber music, and big band jazz. He has arranged music for The Boston Pop Orchestra, the Brooklyn Philharmonic,  the Buffalo Philharmonic Orchestra, the Stockholm Jazz Orchestra, Orchestra Cologne, The City of Prague Philharmonic, Filarmónica de Buenos Aires, Orquesta Nacional de Mexico, Brussels Jazz Orchestra, Camerata Bariloche and many others.

Franzetti has composed a number of film scores, most notably Beat Street, Misunderstood and 1992's The Mambo Kings with Robert Kraft. He also composed the 1986 film La Película del Rey and conducted and arranged the score for Sidney Lumet's 1990 film, Q & A.

Awards and honors
His album Tango Fatal won the 2001 Latin Grammy Award for Best Tango Album. In addition he has won two Latin Grammies for Best Contemporary Classical Compositions. Another Latin Grammy for his album Duets with Eddie Gomez, as well as a Grammy and Latin Grammy as producer of Ruben Blades album Tangos. In 2003, he received two Grammy Award nominations for his album Poeta de Arrabal in the categories Best Classical Crossover Album and a Best Instrumental Arrangement. A  Nomination for Best Contemporary Classical Composition for his Opera, Corpus Evita and a Best Instrumental Arrangement for "Song Without Words" on the album Alborada. He is a recipient of two gold records. Two Composer in Residence Grants from Meet the Composer, and a Fellowship from the New Jersey Council for the Arts. He conducted, arranged, and co-produced soloist Paquito D'Rivera's Grammy-winning album Portraits of Cuba, as well as arranging and conducting Latin Grammy winner Coral with soloist David Sánchez, Grammy nominee Remembrances with soloist Jon Faddis, and many others.

Discography
 1976: The Prime Element
 1977: Graffiti
 1979: Galaxy Dust
 1983: Prometheus
 1984: New York Toccata
 1991: Orquesta Nova
 1992: Salon New York with Orquesta Nova
 1993: Tropic of Capricorn
 1994: Soundtracks and Jazz Tunes
 1995: Astor Piazzolla: A Flute and Piano Tribute (with Jorge de la Vega)
 1995: Images Before Dawn: Symphonic Music of Carlos Franzetti
 1997: Poeta de Arrabal
 1997: Portraits of Cuba (by Paquito D'Rivera)
 1998: Concierto del Plata
 1998: Piano Concerto n.º 2 / Sinfonía n.º 1
 1999: Remembrances
 1999: Obsession
 2000: Tango fatal
 2002: Poeta de Arrabal
 2003: Reflexiones
 2003: You Must Believe in Spring
 2004: Prometheus
 2005: Corpus Evita
 2005: The Jazz Kamerata (Chesky)
 2005: The Prime Element
 2006: Songs for Lovers (Chesky)
 2007: Graffiti
 2007: Carlos Franzetti Trío Live in Buenos Aires
 2008: Film Noir (with guest alto saxophone soloist: Andy Fusco)
 2008: Galaxy Dust
 1998: Piano Concerto n.º 1 / Sinfonía n.º 2 Atlantis
 2008: Duets (with Eddie Gómez)
 2009: Mambo Tango
 2010: New York Meeting (with Gato Barbieri, David Finck, and Néstor Astarita)
 2011: Alborada
 2012: Masters of Bandoneón / Tema Stringazo
 2012: Pierrot et Colombine
 2014: In the Key of Tango
 2016: Lejanía (with Allison Brewster Franzetti)
 2017: Argentum
 2018: Buenos Aires Noir (with Allison Brewster Franzetti)
 2019: Ricordare (with David Finck and Eliot Zigmund)
 2022: In the We Small Hours (with David Finck and Billy Drummond)

References

External links
 Official site
 Carlos Franzetti at the Internet Movie Database
 Carlos Franzetti biographies

1948 births
Living people
Argentine composers
Argentine film score composers
Male film score composers
Argentine people of Italian descent
Grammy Award winners
Latin Grammy Award winners
People from Buenos Aires
Chesky Records artists
Sunnyside Records artists